Michał Daszek (born 27 June 1992) is a Polish handball player for Wisła Płock and the Polish national team.

Career
From 2011 to 2014, he played for MMTS Kwidzyn. In 2014, he joined Wisła Płock. He is well known to be able to play at two positions, right wing for Wisła Płock and right back for the Polish national team.

On 1 February 2015, Poland, including Daszek, won the bronze medal of the 2015 World Championship. He also participated at the 2016 Summer Olympics in Rio de Janeiro, in the men's handball tournament.

State awards
 2015  Silver Cross of Merit

References

External links

1992 births
Living people
People from Tczew
Polish male handball players
Wisła Płock (handball) players
Handball players at the 2016 Summer Olympics
Olympic handball players of Poland